General visceral efferent fibers (GVE) or visceral efferents or autonomic efferents,  are the efferent nerve fibers of the autonomic nervous system (also known as the visceral efferent nervous system  that provide motor innervation to smooth muscle, cardiac muscle, and glands (contrast with special visceral efferent (SVE) fibers) through postganglionic varicosities.

GVE fibers may be either sympathetic or parasympathetic.

The cranial nerves containing GVE fibers include the oculomotor nerve (CN III), the facial nerve (CN VII), the glossopharyngeal nerve (CN IX) and the vagus nerve (CN X).

Additional images

See also
 Nerve fiber
 Preganglionic fibers
 Efferent nerve

References

 
Autonomic nervous system